Falkenhagen is a village in the municipality Landolfshausen, in the district of Göttingen of Lower Saxony, Germany.

References
Falkenhagen on Wiki-Göttingen

Villages in Lower Saxony